Bardstown City Schools is a school district located in Bardstown, Kentucky that was established in 1908. It operates Bardstown High School, Bardstown Middle School, Bardstown Elementary School, Bardstown Primary School, and Early Childhood Education Center. These six school buildings are located on three campuses with currently 2,794 students enrolled for the 2016–2017 school year.

The primary, elementary, middle and high Schools are all managed by a six-member Site-Based Decision Making Council. The SBDM Councils are composed of three teacher representatives, two parent representatives and the school's principal.

Computers and hand-held devices are available in all K-12 schools at a ratio of one computer to every three children.
All classrooms are linked directly indirectly to the Internet.

Bardstown was one of Kentucky's first school systems to adopt a year-round calendar during the 1995–96 school year, and system-wide school uniform policy for students in 1998.

Community Education
Community Education has been serving students for 22 years.  The program operates on a year-round basis offering GED instruction, TABE testing for industry and the WIA program, English Language Learners (ELL) classes, literacy, corrections education, and community education programs.

Bardstown Foundation
The Bardstown Foundation for Excellence in Public Education was started in 1985 as the first private foundation in the state of Kentucky to support a public school system. Since its inception, the foundation has raised more than $800,000 from private sources to enhance the educational programs of Bardstown City Schools.

Clubs and activities

Bardstown High School

 Adventure Club
 Chess Club
 Creative Writing Club
 Future Business Leaders of America
 Fellowship of Christian Athletes (FCA)
 Family Career & Community Leaders of America (FCCLA)
 Future Educators (FEA)
 Fishing Club
 Key Club
 National Honor Society
 Outdoor Trails Club
 PEP Club
 SADD/Youth In Charge
 Speech Team
 Science Olympiad
 Students Tolerating and Respecting Differences in Everyone (STRIDE)
 Tri-M Music Honor Society
 Women in Science
 YClub
 Drama Department

Bardstown Middle School

 Academic Team
 Book Club
 Fellowship of Christian Athletes (FCA)
 Rachel's Challenge
 Speech and Drama
 YClub

Sports
 Athletic Hall of Fame
 Archery
 Baseball
 Basketball – Boys
 Basketball – Girls
 Cheerleading
 Cross Country
 Football
 Golf
 Soccer – Girls
 Soccer – Boys
 Softball
 Tennis
 Track & Field (9 Time State Class A Outdoor Champions)
 Volleyball
the best sports coaches ever

Postgraduate statistics (2016–2017)

Superintendents

See also
 Bardstown Historic District

References

External links
 Bardstown City Schools Official Site
 City of Bardstown
 Kentucky Department of Education

Bardstown, Kentucky
School districts in Kentucky
Education in Nelson County, Kentucky
1908 establishments in Kentucky
School districts established in 1908